Dolphy Theatre (formerly ABS-CBN Studio 1) is a proscenium theatre adjacent in the ABS-CBN Studios in Quezon City, Philippines. It was named in honor of Filipino comedian Dolphy in celebration of his 80th birthday in 2008. It is one of the oldest studios of the Broadcast Center which was used as a newsroom in 1986 when the network re-opened.

The theatre is used by Star Magic. Press conferences, award nights and other events are also held in the venue.

Programs that used the Dolphy Theatre

Film/Series premiere
 Love Is Color Blind (2021)
 BINI & BGYO Dubai Adventures: A Docufilm (2022)
 Beach Bros (2022)

Concerts & awards events
 Gawad Geny Lopez Jr. Bayaning Pilipino Awards (1996–present)
 ABS-CBN Philharmonic Orchestra Concert (2012–present)
 Kalokalike Grand Parade Of Stars (2013–2014)

Funerals
 Angelo Castro, Jr.'s Necrological Services (2012)
 Dolphy's Necrological Mass (2012)
 Lito Balquiedra, Jr.'s Necrological Services (2012)
 Wenn Deramas' Necrological Services (March 5, 2016)

Programming use
 ABS-CBN Sunday TV Mass (1986–2005)
 ASAP (1996)
 Afternoon Delight (1988–1989)
 The Healing Eucharist (2005–2010, 2019)
 Citizen Pinoy 
 Kalatog Pinggan (1986–1988)
 Eat Bulaga! (1989–1994)
 Happy Yipee Yehey! (2012)
 I-Shine Talent Camp TV (2014)
 I Love OPM (2016)
 Showtime (2010)
 Magandang Tanghali Bayan (2002)
 Oras ng Ligaya (1968–1972)
 Pilipinas Got Talent (2010)
 Pinoy Boyband Superstar (2016)
 Sa Linggo nAPO Sila (1992)
 Sharon (2010)
 Star Circle Quest (2004–2005)
 Star Power (2010–2011)
 Star Hunt: The Grand Audition Show (2018)
 Stop, Look, and Listen (1968–1972)
 Superstar (RPN, 1973–1978)
 Tawag ng Tanghalan (2015)
 The Sharon Cuneta Show (1988–1997, occasionally venue for Sharon Cuneta's Birthday and TSCS anniversary special)
 The Voice Kids (2014)
 The X Factor Philippines (2012)
 We Love OPM (2016)
 Wowowee (2006)
 Your Face Sounds Familiar (2015)
 Your Face Sounds Familiar Kids (2017)
 Your Moment (2019)

References

Television studios in the Philippines
ABS-CBN Corporation
Theaters and concert halls in Metro Manila
Eat Bulaga!
Assets owned by ABS-CBN Corporation